Thaaye Unakkaga is a 1966 Indian Tamil-language film directed by P. Pullaiah and written by Kannadasan. The film has an ensemble cast. It is a remake of the 1959 Russian film Ballad of a Soldier. The film was released on 26 August 1966.

Plot

Cast 
Sivaji Ganesan as Captain Swamy
Sivakumar as Major Raju
S. S. Rajendran as Major Raghu
Muthuraman as Johnson
Nagesh as Neelu
Padmini as Devi
C. R. Vijayakumari as Lakshmi
Devika as Reetta
J. Jayalalithaa as Komala
 Santha Kumari as Thaayaramma
Vijayakumar as George
V. K. Ramasamy as Aarumugam
Ennathe Kannaiah as Kannaiya
Pushpalatha as Radha
C. K. Saraswathi as Paravatham
R. S. Manohar as Rajankam
Major Sundarrajan as Vignesh Irudhayaraj
Ramadas as Military Soldier
Kuladeivam Rajagopal as Ranga
Manorama as Padma
Kumari Sachu as Dancer
Comedy Shanmugam as Village People

Production 
After watching the 1959 Russian film Ballad of a Soldier at the International Film Festival in Madras, Kannadasan wanted to remake it in Tamil. The dialogues were written by A. L. Narayanan.

Soundtrack 
Soundtrack was composed by K. V. Mahadevan.

References

External links 
 

1960s Tamil-language films
1966 films
Films scored by K. V. Mahadevan
Indian remakes of foreign films